is a castle structure in Yamaguchi, Japan. It is located on a 338 meter mountain.

History
Kōnomine Castle was built in 1556 by Ōuchi Yoshinaga  as a supporting castle of Ōuchi-shi Yakata, but Mōri Motonari`s army advanced to Suō Province, Ōuchi Yoshinaga left Ōuchi-shi Yakata and Kōnomine Castle without resistance.

In 1638, Kōnomine castle was abandoned.
The castle was listed as one of the Continued Top 100 Japanese Castles in 2017.

Current
The castle is now only ruins, with some stone walls and moats left intact.

Literature

References

Castles in Yamaguchi Prefecture
Historic Sites of Japan
Former castles in Japan
Ruined castles in Japan
1550s establishments in Japan
Ōuchi clan